The Liberty L-6 was a six-cylinder water-cooled inline aircraft engine developed in the United States during World War I.

Design and development

The Liberty L-6, which developed 200–215 hp, was built by the Thomas-Morse Aircraft Corp. and Wright Aeronautical Corp.  Since it was based on the same engine design as the more successful Liberty L-12 V-12 liquid-cooled aviation engine, the L-6's resemblance to the Mercedes D.III German aviation engine, the source for the Liberty V-12's own cylinder and valvetrain design, resulted in the American L-6 engine design bearing a close visual resemblance to the German straight-six aviation powerplant in a number of respects, with at least one L-6 even being mounted postwar into a captured Fokker D.VII fighter for testing in the US. The Liberty L-6's smaller displacement of some 825 cu. in. (13.5 liters) versus the late-war German Mercedes D.IIIaü's 903 cubic inches (14.8 liters) do not seem to have handicapped the American straight-six design, however, as the "Liberty Six" possessed a 5.42:1 CR, while the D.IIIaü had only a 4.64:1 CR, explaining a good bit of the American powerplant's output level—in addition to the 735.5 watt level for German Pferdestärke metric horsepower, versus the then solely-American-based SAE organization's standard of almost 746 watts per one horsepower.

Since the L-6 was too large for mail airplanes and other engines were available, the L-6 was canceled after only 52 had been built. In 1920 10 more L-6 engines were ordered, designated L-825, several of which were installed in the Curtiss PN-1, (only two built), and the Engineering Division TW-1, (only six built).

Hall-Scott also produced a six-cylinder engine using Liberty L-12 components, as the Hall-Scott L-6.

Specifications

See also

References

This article incorporates text from Liberty L-6, a public domain work of the United States Government.
 

1910s aircraft piston engines
Straight-six engines